The First Presbyterian Church of Oakland is a historic church founded in 1853 in Oakland, California. It is a part of the Presbyterian Church (USA).

First Presbyterian Church was the first Christian church in Oakland.

References

External links
 First Presbyterian Church of Oakland website

Oakland, California
Buildings and structures in Alameda County, California
Presbyterian churches in California